Lukovica pri Domžalah is a settlement in the Municipality of Lukovica in the eastern part of the Upper Carniola region of Slovenia. It is the seat of the municipality.

Name
The name of the settlement was changed from Lukovica to Lukovica pri Domžalah in 1955. In the past the German name was Lukowitz.

References

External links 

Lukovica pri Domžalah on Geopedia

Populated places in the Municipality of Lukovica